Zieria is a genus of plants in the family, Rutaceae. About sixty species have been formally described, all of which are endemic to Australia except for one species which is found in New Caledonia. They occur in all Australian states except Western Australia but the genus is under review and a number of species are yet to be described or the description published. Zierias are similar to the better known genus Boronia but can be distinguished by the number of stamens in the flowers. The name Zieria honours the Polish botanist John Zier.

Description
Plants in the genus Zieria are shrubs or small trees. The leaves are arranged in opposite pairs and are usually compound with three leaflets similar in shape but the middle leaflet slightly larger. The flowers are arranged in groups in the leaf axils and have four fused sepals and four petals alternating with the sepals. There are four stamens (eight in Boronia) and four carpels with their styles fused. The fruit have four lobes, each containing one or two seeds.

Taxonomy and naming
The genus Zieria was first formally described in 1798 by James Edward Smith and the description was published in Transactions of the Linnean Society of London. Smith did not nominate a type species but James Armstrong nominated Zieria smithii as the lectotype. The name Zieria honours "John Zier, a Polish botanist, who assisted F.C. Ehrhart in his collection of plants of the Electorate of Hanover, 1780-83, and afterwards worked in London, where he died in 1793."

In a 2002 study of the genus, James Armstrong placed each species into one of six groups, based on its morphology. The groups are:
 Group A: Z. adenodonta, Z. adenophora, Z. buxijugum, Z. collina, Z. floydii, Z. formosa, Z. furfuracea, Z. granulata, Z. hindii, Z. obcordata, Z. parrisiae, Z. robusta, Z. tuberculata, Z. verrucosa;
 Group B: Z. arborescens, Z. caducibracteata, Z. lasiocaulis, Z. oreocena, Z. southwellii;
 Group C: Z. chevalieri, Z. fraseri, Z. laevigata, Z. laxiflora;
 Group D: Z. montana, Z. prostrata, Z. robertsiorum, Z. smithii;
 Group E: Z. aspalathoides, Z. citriodora, Z. ingramii, Z. minutiflora, Z. obovata, Z. odorifera, Z. pilosa, Z. rimulosa;
 Group F: Z. baeuerlenii, Z. covenyi, Z. cytisoides, Z. involucrata, Z. littoralis, Z. murphyi, Z. veronicea.

In a 2015 study, using a combination of two non-coding chloroplast DNA regions, Internal transcribed spacer and some morphological characters, Cynthia Morton concluded that the genus as presently described is monophyletic. A tentative arrangement of 32 of Armstrong's 42 species was also suggested:
 Group 1: Z. adenodonta, Z. baeuerlenii, Z. collina, Z. cytisoides;
 Group 2: Z. buxijugum, Z. caducibracteata, Z. formosa, Z. granulata, Z. littoralis, Z. parrisiae, Z. tuberculata, Z. verrucosa;
 Group 3: Z. fraseri, Z. odorifera;
 Group 4: Z. prostrata, Z. smithii;
 Group 5: Z. aspalathoides, Z. ingramii;
 Group 6: Z. adenophora, Z. furfuracea, Z. laxiflora;
 Group 7: Z. montana, Z. southwellii;
 Group 8: Z. covenyi, Z. murphyi, Z. odorifera, Z. robusta.

Zieria citriodora, Z. arborescens, Z. minutiflora, Z. obcordata and Z. pilosa were not able to be resolved in this study.

Distribution
Plants in the genus Zieria are endemic to Australia, except for Zieria chevalieri, which is found in New Caledonia. Zierias occur in all Australian states except Western Australia.

Species list
The species described to date (October 2017) and listed by the Australian Plant Census are:

Zieria actites Duretto & P.I.Forst.
Zieria adenodonta (F.Muell.) J.A.Armstr. – Wollumbin zieria
Zieria adenophora Blakely – Araluen zieria
Zieria alata Duretto & P.I.Forst.
Zieria arborescens Sims – stinkwood
Zieria aspalathoides A.Cunn. ex Benth. – whorled zieria
Zieria baeuerlenii J.A.Armstr. – Bomaderry zieria
Zieria bifida Duretto & P.I.Forst.
Zieria boolbunda Duretto & P.I.Forst. – Box Range zieria
Zieria buxijugum J.D.Briggs & J.A.Armstr. 
Zieria caducibracteata J.A.Armstr.
Zieria cephalophila Duretto & P.I.Forst.
Zieria chevalieri Virot – endemic to New Caledonia
Zieria citriodora J.A.Armstr. – lemon-scented zieria
Zieria collina C.T.White – hill zieria
Zieria compacta C.T.White 
Zieria covenyi J.A.Armstr. – Coveny's zieria
Zieria cytisoides Sm. – downy zieria
Zieria distans Duretto & P.I.Forst.
Zieria eungellaensis Duretto & P.I.Forst.
Zieria exsul Duretto & P.I.Forst. 
Zieria floydii J.A.Armstr. – Floyd's zieria
Zieria formosa J.D.Briggs & J.A.Armstr. – shapely zieria
Zieria fraseri Hook. 
Zieria furfuracea R.Br. ex Benth.
Zieria graniticola J.A.Armstr. ex Duretto & P.I.Forst. 
Zieria granulata  C.Moore ex Benth. – Illawarra zieria, hill zieria
Zieria hindii J.A.Armstr. – Hind's zieria
Zieria hydroscopica Duretto & P.I.Forst.
Zieria inexpectata Duretto & P.I.Forst.
Zieria ingramii J.A.Armstr – Keith's zieria
Zieria insularis Duretto & P.I.Forst. 
Zieria involucrata R.Br. ex Benth.
Zieria laevigata Bonpl. – smooth zieria, twiggy midge bush
Zieria lasiocaulis – J.A.Armstr. Willi Willi zieria
Zieria laxiflora (Benth.) Domin – wallum zieria
Zieria littoralis J.A.Armstr. – dwarf zieria
Zieria madida Duretto & P.I.Forst
Zieria minutiflora Domin – twiggy zieria
Zieria montana J.A.Armstr.
Zieria murphyi Blakely – Murphy's zieria
Zieria obcordata A.Cunn. – obcordate-leafed zieria
Zieria obovata (C.T.White) J.A.Armstr.
Zieria odorifera J.A.Armstr.
Zieria oreocena J.A.Armstr. – Grampians zieria
Zieria parrisiae J.D.Briggs & J.A.Armstr. – Parris' zieria 
Zieria pilosa Rudge – hairy zieria
Zieria prostrata J.A.Armstr. – headland zieria
Zieria rimulosa C.T.White
Zieria robertsiorum J.A.Armstr. 
Zieria robusta Maiden & Betche – round-leafed zieria
Zieria scopulus Duretto & P.I.Forst.
Zieria smithii Jacks. – sandfly zieria
Zieria southwellii J.A.Armstr.
Zieria tenuis Duretto & P.I.Forst.
Zieria tuberculata J.A.Armstr.
Zieria vagans Duretto & P.I.Forst.
Zieria veronicea (F.Muell.) Benth. – pink zieria
Zieria verrucosa J.A.Armstr. 
Zieria whitei J.A.Armstr. ex Duretto & P.I.Forst.

Conservation
Zieria parrisiae is listed as "critically endangered" under the Australian Government Environment Protection and Biodiversity Conservation Act 1999. A further eleven are listed as "endangered" and eight as "vulnerable".

References

External links

 
Zanthoxyloideae genera